Omaha hold 'em (also known as Omaha holdem or simply Omaha) is a community card poker game similar to Texas hold 'em, where each player is dealt four cards and must make their best hand using exactly two of them, plus exactly three of the five community cards. The exact origin of the game is unknown, but casino executive Robert Turner first brought Omaha into a casino setting  when he introduced the game to Bill Boyd, who offered it as a game at the Las Vegas Golden Nugget Casino (calling it "Nugget Hold'em"). Omaha uses a 52-card French deck. Omaha hold 'em 8-or-better is the "O" game featured in H.O.R.S.E.

History
Omaha hold 'em derives its name from two types of games.

"Hold'em" refers to a game using community cards that are shared by all players. This is opposed to draw games, where each player's hand is composed only of concealed cards, and stud games, where each player's unique hand contains a mix of cards visible to the other players and concealed hole cards.

In the original Omaha poker game, players were only dealt two hole cards and had to use both to make a hand combined with community cards. This version of Omaha is defined in the glossary of Super/System (under Omaha) as being interchangeable with "Tight hold 'em". Across all the variations of the game, the requirement of using exactly two hole cards is the only consistent rule. The "Omaha" part of the name represents this aspect of the game.

Explanation
In North American casinos, the term "Omaha" can refer to several poker games. The original game is also commonly known as "Omaha high". A high-low split version called "Omaha Hi-Lo", or sometimes "Omaha eight-or-better" or "Omaha/8", is also played. In Europe, "Omaha" still typically refers to the high version of the game, usually played pot-limit. Pot-limit Omaha is often abbreviated as "PLO." Pot-limit and no-limit Omaha eight-or-better can be found in some casinos and online, though no-limit is rarer.

It is often said that Omaha is a game of "the nuts", i.e. the best possible high or low hand, because it frequently takes "the nuts" to win a showdown.  It is also a game where between the cards in their hand and the community cards a player may have drawing possibilities to multiple different types of holdings. For example, a player may have both a draw to a flush and a full house using different combinations of cards. At times, even seasoned players may need additional time to figure what draws are possible for their hand.

The basic differences between Omaha and Texas hold 'em are these: first, each player is dealt four hole cards instead of two. The betting rounds and layout of community cards are identical. At showdown, each player's hand is the best five-card hand made from exactly three of the five cards on the board, plus exactly two of the player's own cards. Unlike Texas hold 'em, a player cannot play four or five of the cards on the board with fewer than two of their own.

A maximum of eleven players can be dealt a hand in Omaha, regardless of whether or not burn cards are used, however Omaha is most commonly played six handed or nine handed.

Some specific things to notice about Omaha hands are:
 As in Texas hold 'em, three or more suited cards on the board makes a flush possible, but unlike that game, a player always needs two of that suit in hand to play a flush. A player with  can play the spade flush.
 The same concept applies to straights. In Omaha, a player cannot use only one hole card and four cards on the board to play a straight. But a player with  can play a straight from 3 to 7;
 Two pair on the board does not make a full house for anyone with a single matching card as it does in Texas hold 'em. A player with  can use their J-9 to play the full house  (or ). Likewise, a player with  can use their 5-5 to play the full house .
 Likewise, with three of a kind on the board, a player must have a pair in hand to make a full house. This is probably the most frequently misread hand in Omaha. (Naturally, a person with the fourth jack in hand can make four jacks because any other card in hand can act as the fifth card, or "kicker".)

Omaha hi-low split-8 or better

In Omaha hi-low split-8 or better (simply Omaha/8), each player makes a separate five-card high hand and five-card ace-to-five low hand (eight-high or lower to qualify), and the pot is split between the high and low (which may be the same player). To qualify for low, a player must be able to play an 8-7-6-5-4 or lower (this is why it is called "eight or better"). A few casinos play with a 9-low qualifier instead, but this is rare. Each player can play any two of their four hole cards to make their high hand, and any two of their four hole cards to make their low hand. If there is no qualifying low hand, the high hand wins (scoops) the whole pot. This game is usually played in the fixed limit version, although pot limit Omaha/8 is becoming more popular. A few low-stakes online tournaments feature no limit Omaha/8.

The brief explanation above belies the complexity of the game, so a number of examples will be useful here to clarify it. The table below shows a five-card board of community cards at the end of play, and then lists for each player the initial private four-card hand dealt to him or her, and the best five-card high hand and low hand each player can play on showdown:

In the deal above, Chris wins the high-hand half of the pot with their J-high straight, and Bryan and Eve split the low half (getting a quarter of the pot each) with 7-5-3-2-A.

Some specific things to notice about Omaha/8 hands are:
 In order for anyone to qualify low, there must be at least three cards of differing ranks 8 or below on the board.  For example, a board of K-8-J-7-5 makes low possible (the best low hand would be A-2, followed by A-3, 2-3, etc.)  A board of K-8-J-8-5, however, cannot make any qualifying low (the best low hand possible would be J-8-5-2-A, which does not qualify). Statistically, around 60% of the time a low hand is possible.
 Low hands often tie, and high straights occasionally tie as well, as do, even more rarely, full houses.  In theory, it is possible to win as little as a 14th of a pot (though this is extraordinarily rare).  Winning a quarter of the pot is quite common, and is called "getting quartered."  One dangerous aspect of playing for the low pot is the concept of "counterfeiting". To illustrate, if a player has, for example, 2-3 and two other cards in their hand and the flop is A-6-7, that player has flopped the "nut low". However, if either a 2 or a 3 hit the board on the turn or the river, the hand is "counterfeited" and the nut low hand is lost (the player still has a much weaker low hand however, with 3-4, 3-5 and 4-5 making better lows). This is why there is significant extra value in possessing the "protected" nut low. To illustrate this, if the player has 2-3-4 in their hand their low is protected, i.e. if a 2 or 3 hits the board they still have the lowest possible hand. To lose the nut low in this case either a 2 and a 3, a 2 and a 4, or a 3 and a 4 would have to hit the board on the turn and the river (giving the nut low to a player holding 4-5, 3-5 and 2-5, respectively), an unlikely possibility. For similar reasons it is significantly better to possess the protected nut low draw over the low draw. For example, this could be having A-2-3 with a flop of 7-8-9; any low card below 7 on the turn or river gives the player the best low.
 When four or five low cards appear on the board, it can become very difficult to read the low hands properly. In this situation he is often said to be playing their "live" 4, that is, their 4, plus some other low card that matches the board but still makes a low because the one on the board isn't needed. However, a player with  can only play 7-5-3-2-A low; even though he has a "live" 3, he must play two low cards from their hand, and so he must play their 7-3, and cannot make a 6-high low hand.
 Starting hands with three or four cards of one rank are very bad. Since the only possible combination of two cards from this hand is 2-2, it is impossible to make low. As no deuce remains to appear on the board, it will be impossible to make three deuces or deuces full, and anyone with any matching card to the board will make a higher pair. Likewise, starting with four cards of one suit makes it less likely that you will be able to make a flush. Starting with four different suits yields no chance for a flush, and starting with four disconnected cards reduces straight possibilities. Computer analysis of the best starting hands has proven that the best starting hand for Omaha is A-A-K-K (double suited). One favorite starting hand for Omaha is A-A-J-10 (double suited), because of its wider range for making the nut straight (J-7, Q-8, K-9, and A-10). For the Hi-Lo variation, the most valuable starting holding is A-A-2-3 (double suited).
 Hands to avoid tend to contain mainly middle-ranked cards, which are of little use for any low splits and which tend to generate lower pairs and sets, weaker flushes and lower straights and can be very expensive. Four of a kind is the worst possible starting hand in Omaha, in contrast to most other poker games, where it is exceptionally strong.
 Straights and flushes are ignored when judging low hands.  Low hand ranks from best to worst: 5-4-3-2-A (the wheel), 6-4-3-2-A, 6-5-3-2-A, 6-5-4-2-A, ..., 8-7-6-5-4. Low hands can thus be read as numbers between 54,321 and 87,654 (with the exception of any number that has a pair, i.e. 54,322). The lowest number that any player can make, while ordered from high card to low, is the best possible low hand in play. For example: 2♠ 3♣ 5♥ 6♥ 7♥ wins over A♠ 2♣ 3♥ 4♣ 8♠

Pot-limit Omaha 

Pot-limit Omaha ( frequently shortened to PLO) is popular in Europe, online, and in high-stakes "mixed games" played in some American casinos. This variant is more often played high only, but can also be played high-low. To a still greater degree than in Limit Omaha Hi-Lo, PLO is a game of drawing, when drawing, to the nut hand. Second best flushes and straights can be, and frequently become, losing hands, especially when a player is willing to commit their entire stack to the pot. Furthermore, because of the exponential growth of the pot size in pot-limit play, seeing one of these hands to the end can be very expensive and carry immense reverse implied odds.

Wraps
In poker, an out is any unseen card in the deck that will give a player the best hand. A wrap is a straight draw with nine or more outs. This is called a wrap because the player’s hole cards are said to wrap-around the board cards. In hold-em, where players have two hole cards, the greatest number of straight outs possible is eight; however, in Omaha, there are four hole cards, which can result in straight draws which can have up to 20 outs. To hit a straight, any of the following cards is needed:  .

Redraws
A desirable hand to have in PLO is the current best hand with a redraw. In fact, with the  board,  is approximately an 80-20 money favorite over a random hand containing ace-king (see freerolling). Even a pair of queens with any two spades is better than 55-45 against a random ace-king hand.

Omaha Variations
The most common variations of Pot Limit Omaha high are Five-card Omaha, commonly referred as "Big O" very popular in Southeastern United States as a home game and Six-card Omaha or 6-O which can be found in many casinos across the UK. Some online poker rooms support Five-card Omaha, Six-card Omaha and Courchevel.

"Big O" (occasionally called Five-card Omaha or 5-O) began appearing in Southern California in 2008 and had spread to most of the card rooms in the area by the end of the year.

Sometimes the high-low split game is played with a 9 or a 7-high qualifier instead of 8-high. It can also be played with five cards dealt to each player instead of four. In that case, the same rules for making a hand apply: exactly two from the player's hand, and exactly three from the board.

Courchevel
Courchevel is named after the high-end ski resort in the French Alps, near the Italian border. According to the urban legend, bored tourists wanted to play a version of poker no-one has ever played before, so they came up with this game. The place where Courchevel was most commonly played was the Aviation Club de France in Paris. That casino is now closed.

In the game of Courchevel, players are dealt five hole cards rather than four. Simultaneously, the first community card is dealt. Following an opening round of betting, two additional community cards are dealt, creating a 3-card flop, where the structure of the game is then identical to standard Omaha. Still, exactly two of the five hole cards must be used. Courchevel is popular in France but its popularity has expanded in other parts of Europe, particularly the United Kingdom. Courchevel is also available in a hi-low 8 or better variety, and while Courchevel is rarely offered on any of the major online poker sites, as of 2019, hi-low sit-and-go games at the micro stakes level can be found taking place several times a day on Pokerstars, which had the game since 2013.

See also 
 Glossary of poker terms
 List of poker hands
 Texas hold'em
 Greek hold 'em

Notes

External links 
 Strategy from 1999 World Series of Poker Omaha champion Steve Badger
 Omaha Recommended Starting Hands Strategy Lou Krieger
 How to Play Omaha Poker
 A Beginner’s Guide to Pot-Limit Omaha PokerNews
 Pot Limit Omaha From Square One Professional Rakeback

Poker variants